The 16629 / 16630 Malabar Express is an Express train service in India, named after the Malabar Coast, the south-western coastal region of India from  to . As the name suggests, it connects the two ends of the Malabar region (the Southern and the Northern). The train has one of the longest running time between Mangalore and Thiruvananthapuram Central. It shares its rake with 16603/04 Maveli Express, 12601/02 Mangalore Mail and 22637/38 West Coast Super Fast Express. Malabar Express is one of the most popular trains in Kerala.

History
The train initially ran between Madras and Calicut from 1888 & later extended to Mangalore to become Malabar Express. On July 1, 1940 the train route was extended to Cochin Harbour Terminus which later got extended to Thiruvananthapuram Central to become Trivandrum Mangalore Malabar Express

Traction
It is hauled by an Erode based  WAP-4 or Royapuram based WAP-7 electric locomotive on its entire journey.

Service

This train runs between Mangalore Central and Thiruvananthapuram Central. The train no. 16629 starts from Trivandrum at 19:00 hours and reaches Mangalore at 10:10 hours the next day. In the return direction, train no. 16630 leaves Mangalore at 18:15 hours and reaches Trivandrum at 09:10 hours the next day. It runs via Trunk route Kottayam

Coach composition
It has 23 coaches (10 sleeper class, 4 3-tier AC , 1 2-tier AC, 1 AC first class-cum-2-tier, 5 second class, and 2 brake van-cum-second sitter).

Route & Halts

See also
 West Coast Express
 Mangalore Central railway station
 Thiruvananthapuram Central railway station

Transport in Thiruvananthapuram
Transport in Mangalore
Named passenger trains of India
Rail transport in Kerala
Rail transport in Karnataka
Rail transport in Puducherry
Express trains in India